Agarakkirangudi is a village in the Mayiladuthurai taluk of Mayiladuthurai district, Tamil Nadu, India.

Demographics 

 census, Agarakkirangudi had a total population of 1792 with 915 males and 877 females. The sex ratio was 978. The literacy rate was 74.01.

References 

 

Villages in Mayiladuthurai district